Maria 'Despina' Mavrocordat (1917–2014), married name Sayn-Wittgenstein, was a female Romanian international table tennis, volleyball and basketball player.

Table tennis career
She won a bronze medal during the 1948 World Table Tennis Championships in the Corbillon Cup for Romania. The team consisted of Sari Szász-Kolozsvári, Angelica Rozeanu and G Beca.

Personal life
She graduated from the Faculty of Law and Science. She was chairman of the Romanian Tennis Table Federation and emigrated to Germany and married into the Sayn-Wittgenstein family.

See also
 List of World Table Tennis Championships medalists

References

Romanian female table tennis players
Romanian emigrants to Germany
Sportspeople from Iași
1917 births
2014 deaths
World Table Tennis Championships medalists